The Robert Special Jury Prize (Short)  is one of the special awards presented occasionally by the Danish Film Academy at the annual Robert Awards ceremony. The award was first handed out in 1995.

Honorees 
 1995:  (posthumously)
 1998: Henning Bahs
 2001:  – 
 2005: Max Kestner –

References

External links 
  

1995 establishments in Denmark
Awards established in 1995
Jury Prize
Short film awards